The A180 is a primary route in northern England, that runs from the M180 motorway to Cleethorpes. The road is a continuation of the M180, but built to lower specifications: it is mainly dual two-lane without hard shoulders.

Route
The A180 begins at junction 5 of the M180 in North Lincolnshire, where it picks up traffic from the motorway and the A15 road heading towards the ports of Grimsby and Immingham. The road crosses the border into North East Lincolnshire and has a junction with the A160 road to Immingham Dock. It bypasses the town of Immingham and Habrough before meeting the A1173 road (linking to the A46 road to Lincoln). The road then has a junction with the A1136 road prior to having two roundabout junctions with local roads. In central Grimsby, the A180 meets the A16 road (to Louth and Boston) at a roundabout, and continues along the front into Cleethorpes. In central Cleethopes the A180 terminates at a roundabout with the A46 road (clee road)and the A1098 road(Isaacs hill).

History and noise
The A180 was opened in 1983 as an extension to the M180.

Its ribbed concrete surface makes it the noisiest road in the United Kingdom. In June 2017, sound levels inside a family car travelling along the road were measured at up to 92 decibels.

In the 2000s, parts of the road that lie close to inhabited areas were resurfaced with tarmac following continued complaints and campaigns. Calls for the entire stretch of the road to be resurfaced continued. In March 2018 it was announced that the remaining concrete sections would be resurfaced in three stages at a cost of £10 million.

References

External links

Borough of North East Lincolnshire
Borough of North Lincolnshire
Roads in England
Roads in Lincolnshire